Liao Lei was a KMT general from Guangxi. He participated in the Battle of Shanghai, the Battle of Wuhan, and the Battle of Xuzhou and the Battle of Suixian–Zaoyang in Hubei. He died of a stroke.

References 

National Revolutionary Army generals from Guangxi
1890 births
1939 deaths
People from Yulin, Guangxi